Hebron Church may refer to:

United Kingdom
 Hebron Church, Long Ashton, North Somerset, England
 Hebron Chapel, Ton Pentre, Rhondda Cynon Taf, Wales

United States
 Hebron Church, Cemetery, and Academy, Commerce, Georgia
 Hebron Baptist Church, Dacula, Georgia
 Hebron Presbyterian Church, Beautancus, North Carolina
 Hebron Methodist Church, Oakville, North Carolina
 Hebron Church (Bucksville, South Carolina)
 Hebron Lutheran Church, Madison, Virginia
 Hebron Church (Intermont, West Virginia)